Thomas Stent (died 1912) was an architect in New York City. He assisted Alexander Saeltzer on the Astor Public Library and was the architect for the 1879–1881 expansion.

Stent was trained and practised in England before coming to London, Canada West in 1855. In 1858, he moved to Ottawa.

He designed "Belvoir" in Delaware Township, Middlesex County, Ontario. The house at Belvoir (pronounced "Beever") was owned by Helen Gibson Weld's grandfather, Richard Gibson, 1840-1911.

At Parliament Hill, the team of Thomas Stent and Augustus Laver, under the pseudonym of Stat nomen in umbra, won the prize for the second category, which included the East and West Blocks. These proposals were selected for their sophisticated use of Gothic architecture, which was thought to remind people of parliamentary democracy's history, would contradict the republican Neoclassicism of the United States' capital, and would be suited to the rugged surroundings while also being stately. $300,000 was allocated for the main building, and $120,000 for each of the departmental buildings.

Stent and Laver also won the competition to build San Francisco City Hall, which was completed in 1898 but destroyed by an earthquake in 1906.

References

British emigrants to Canada
Canadian emigrants to the United States
1912 deaths
Architects from New York City
Year of birth missing